Zakaria Moradi (born August 14, 1998) is an Iranian football player  who played as a winger for Iranian club Chooka Talesh in the Azadegan League.

Club career

Esteghlal
He made his debut for Esteghlal in 15th fixtures of 2019–20 Iran Pro League against Shahin Bushehr while he substituted in for Hrvoje Milić.

References

Living people
1998 births
Association football forwards
Iranian footballers
Esteghlal F.C. players
Kurdish sportspeople
Iranian Kurdish people
Persian Gulf Pro League players
People from Karaj
21st-century Iranian people